River Islands at Lathrop is a planned community on a  site in the Sacramento-San Joaquin River Delta in Lathrop, California, United States. As of 2018, approximately 800 homes of the first-phase of 4,284 houses had been built.

Plan
The developer is the Cambay Group of Walnut Creek, California which is an American subsidiary of Somerston Holdings Limited of the United Kingdom. Plans call for the completion of 11,000 homes, a town center, business parks, and recreational areas over a 25-year development period. In 2011, the developers stated construction of homes would not begin until late 2013 or early 2014 at the earliest."

In October 2011, Banta Elementary School District approved the purchase of a 30-acre site within River Islands in Lathrop for construction of a k-8 charter school. The 450-student technology school was proposed to open in August 2013 with an eventual expansion for a high school and college.

In 2018, the Tri-Valley-San Joaquin Valley Regional Rail Authority indicated its plan to run trains to River Islands as the service's initial terminus.

History
The project was initially proposed in 1996 as a "mega resort" called Gold Rush City with theme parks, golf courses and private homes. After substantial criticism about building within a flood plain, the plan was changed to a planned community surrounded by wide levees. Since being proposed in 2001, the development has been delayed several years due to lawsuits, concerns about flooding, environmental impact issues and a downturn in the housing market. In 2003, Cambay Group settled lawsuits by the Sierra Club by establishing an $8.2 million trust for the protection of local farmland. In 2009, the development company stated that construction would be further delayed because of the downturn in the housing market.

References

External links
http://www.riverislands.com/

Planned cities in the United States
Planned developments
Lathrop, California